Willis Beaumont McCabe (July 19, 1897 – August 14, 1960) was a college football, baseball, and basketball player for the Tennessee Volunteers of the University of Tennessee. He won the Porter Cup and was the quarterback on the football team. He played minor league baseball.

References

1897 births
1960 deaths
American football quarterbacks
Sportspeople from Topeka, Kansas
Players of American football from Kansas
Basketball players from Kansas
Baseball players from Kansas
Tennessee Volunteers football players
Knoxville Smokies players
Tennessee Volunteers basketball players
American men's basketball players